Krisztina Gyetván (born 20 December 1979 in Vác) is a former Hungarian handballer.

References

External links
 Career statistics at Worldhandball

1979 births
Living people
People from Vác
Hungarian female handball players
Sportspeople from Pest County